Buckingham Park is a suburban residential neighbourhood contiguous with the north-west edge of Aylesbury, Buckinghamshire, England. It is currently the location of major housing developments on two sites known originally as Weedon Hill and Berryfields. Buckingham Park is also the name of the civil parish, part of Aylesbury Vale District Authority. The neighbourhood is close to the River Thame.

History
The development is on the area of land to the north of Aylesbury where the Battle of Aylesbury is reputed to have taken place in 1642.  Because of this special attention was paid to the area in the pre-construction archaeological excavation carried out in 2008, however only 24 musket shot were found.  However, as the 247 bodies of the dead soldiers who had lain in that field were reburied in Hardwick in 1818, it is likely that any artefacts would have been reburied with them.  In plans for the new estate roads have been named after important figures from the battle, including Prince Rupert Drive and Colonel Grantham Avenue.

Housing development
Building of the Weedon Hill housing development started in 2007. As of 2015, approximately 1,000 homes have been completed out of 1035 planned dwellings, as well as a community centre, primary school, parks and play areas and a private care home . A retail development includes a Budgens supermarket, pharmacy, barber, beauty salon and fish and chips shop.

Buckingham Park was expected to be completed in late 2015 or early 2016.

Transport
A new railway station, Aylesbury Vale Parkway opened on 14 December 2008, ready to serve the new housing developments. The first phase of the Western Link Road, a new link road, connecting the A41 and the A418 started construction in August 2013 and is now complete. Buckingham Park is also served by two bus routes.

Governance
Buckingham Park parish was established in April 2011. It includes the housing development of Buckingham Park (formerly Weeden Hill). Prior to this Weedon Hill was within Weedon parish. Buckingham Park parish is within the Weedon ward of Aylesbury Vale District Authority.

Education
Buckingham Park Church of England Primary School is located adjacent to the Buckingham Park Community Centre. It opened in September 2012 and was the first new school opened in Buckinghamshire in the 21st century.

References

External links
Buckingham Park Parish Council
 Outline planning application of the Weedon Hill development

Aylesbury
Housing estates in Buckinghamshire